Taj Muhammad is a Pakistani politician who had been a member of the Provincial Assembly of Khyber Pakhtunkhwa from August 2018 till January 2023.

Political career
Khan served as the tehsil nazim (Mayor) of Battagram Tehsil from 2001 to 2005. During his mayoral period he administered the tehsil well and oversaw a number of development projects.

He was elected for the first time to the NWFP assembly for Constituency PF-59 (Battagram-I) in the Pakistani general election 2008 on an independent seat and defeated the JUI-F candidate.

Khan context election 2013 but was unsuccessful

He was re-elected to the Provincial Assembly of Khyber Pakhtunkhwa as a candidate of Pakistan Tehreek-e-Insaf from Constituency PK-29 (Battagram-II) in the 2018 Pakistani general election.

References

Living people
Pakistan Tehreek-e-Insaf MPAs (Khyber Pakhtunkhwa)
Year of birth missing (living people)